The Diodotid dynasty was a Hellenistic dynasty founded by Seleucid viceroy Diodotus I Soter in 255 BC, ruling the far-eastern Kingdom of Bactria. The dynasty reached its zenith under Eucratides I the Great, who conquered large parts of modern day Pakistan and Northern India.

References

 
Greco-Bactrian Kingdom
Hellenistic dynasties